Miyuki Kobayashi may refer to:

, Japanese writer
, Japanese sprint canoeist